Loïc Chetout (born 23 September 1992) is a French former professional racing cyclist, who rode professionally between 2015 and 2019 for UCI Professional Continental team .

He made his Grand Tour début at the 2016 Vuelta a España, finishing 138th overall with one top ten placing. His first Monuments races came in 2017, riding the Tour of Flanders and Paris–Roubaix.

Career achievements

Major results
2014
 1st Stage 3a Ronde de l'Isard
2016
 2nd Classic Loire Atlantique
 8th Paris–Camembert
 10th Grand Prix de Denain
2018
 1st  Combativity classification Tour of Oman

Grand Tour general classification results timeline

References

External links
 

1992 births
Living people
French male cyclists
Sportspeople from Chambéry
Cyclists from Auvergne-Rhône-Alpes